Schoenersville is a suburban village split between Hanover Township in Lehigh County and Hanover Township in Northampton County, Pennsylvania. It is pronounced "SHOO-nerz-vil" and is part of the Lehigh Valley metropolitan area, which has a population of 861,899 and is the 68th most populous metropolitan area in the U.S. as of the 2020 census.

NW-to-SE Schoenersville Road serves as the county line, coming up from Bethlehem and meeting NE-to-SW Airport Road (Route 987) in the village, and beyond there becoming Weaversville Road. Schoenersville is split between the Allentown zip code of 18109 and the Bethlehem zip code of 18017.

Lehigh Valley International Airport is located just southwest of the village. From the early 1990s through July 2004, the Airport Authority bought up and cleared a number of the village's properties in order to comply with an FAA mandate for a runway protective zone.

References

Unincorporated communities in Lehigh County, Pennsylvania
Unincorporated communities in Northampton County, Pennsylvania
Unincorporated communities in Pennsylvania